José R. "Joe" Román Abreu (born November 30, 1975) is a Puerto Rican politician and the former mayor of San Lorenzo. Román is affiliated with the Popular Democratic Party (PPD) and has served as mayor from 2001 until 2021.

In late May 2020, Román Abreu announced he had cancer and would undergo surgery.

References

Living people
Mayors of places in Puerto Rico
Popular Democratic Party (Puerto Rico) politicians
People from San Lorenzo, Puerto Rico
1975 births